United Airlines Flight 811 was a regularly scheduled airline flight from Los Angeles to Sydney, with intermediate stops at Honolulu and Auckland. On February 24, 1989, the Boeing 747-122 serving the flight experienced a cargo-door failure in flight shortly after leaving Honolulu. The resulting explosive decompression blew out several rows of seats, killing nine passengers. The aircraft returned to Honolulu and landed with no further incident.

Aircraft

The aircraft involved was a Boeing 747-122 (registration number N4713U). It was delivered to United Airlines on November 3, 1970. It was the 89th 747 built. At the time of the accident, the Boeing had accumulated 58,814 total flight hours, 15,028 flight 'pressurization' cycles, and had not been involved in any previous accidents.

On February 24, 1989, the aircraft was scheduled by United Airlines to operate as Flight 811 from Los Angeles International Airport in Los Angeles, California, to Sydney Airport in Mascot, New South Wales, Australia, with intermediate stops at Honolulu International Airport in Honolulu, Hawaii, and Auckland Airport in Auckland, New Zealand.  Flight 811 operated without incident on the first leg of its scheduled flight, from Los Angeles to Honolulu, and no difficulties were reported by the flight crew upon arriving at Honolulu, where a crew change occurred.

After the accident, the aircraft was repaired and put back into service with United, but was re-registered as N4724U.  In 1997, the aircraft was taken out of service and passed onto Air Dabia as C5-FBS.  Air Dabia ceased operations in 1998, and the aircraft was abandoned at Plattsburgh International Airport, where it was scrapped in 2004.

Flight crew
Starting in Honolulu, Flight 811 was helmed by Captain David Cronin (age 59). At the time of the accident, Cronin had logged around 28,000 flight hours, including roughly 1,600 hours in Boeing 747 aircraft. Flight 811 was Cronin's penultimate scheduled flight before his mandatory retirement.

The remaining flight crew consisted of First Officer Gregory Slader (48), and Flight Engineer Randal Thomas (46), and 15 flight attendants. The first officer and flight engineer had logged 14,500 flight hours and 20,000 flight hours, respectively.

Accident

Flight 811 took off from Honolulu International Airport at 01:52 local time, with 337 passengers and 18 crew members on board.  During the climb, the crew made preparations to detour around thunderstorms along the plane's track; the captain anticipated turbulence and kept the passenger seatbelt sign lit. 

About a second and a half later, the forward cargo door blew off. It swung out with such force that it tore a hole in the fuselage. Pressure differentials and aerodynamic forces caused the cabin floor to cave in, and 10 seats (G and H of rows 8 through 12) were ejected from the cabin. All eight passengers seated in these locations were ejected from the aircraft, as was the passenger in seat 9F. Seats 8G and 12G were unoccupied. A gaping hole was left in the aircraft, through which a flight attendant, Mae Sapolu in the business-class cabin, was almost blown out. Purser Laura Brentlinger hung on to the steps leading to the upper deck, and was dangling from them when the decompression occurred. Passengers and crew members saw her clinging to a seat leg and were able to pull her back inside the cabin, although she was severely injured.

The pilots initially believed that a bomb had gone off inside the airliner, as this accident happened just two months after Pan Am Flight 103 was blown up over Lockerbie, Scotland. They began an emergency descent to reach an altitude where the air was breathable, while also performing a 180° left turn to fly back to Honolulu. The explosion damaged components of the on-board emergency oxygen supply system, as it was primarily located in the forward cargo sidewall area, just aft of the cargo door.

The debris ejected from the aircraft during the explosive decompression damaged the Number 3 and 4 engines. Engine 3 was experiencing heavy vibration, no N1 tachometer reading, and a low exhaust-gas temperature (EGT) and engine-pressure ratio, so the crew shut it down. At 02:20, an emergency was declared and the crew began dumping fuel to reduce the aircraft landing weight. The N1 reading of engine number 4 soon fell to almost zero, its EGT reading was high, and it was emitting flames, so they shut it down. Some of the explosively ejected debris damaged the right wing's leading edge, dented the horizontal stabilizer on that side, and damaged the vertical stabilizer.

During the descent, Captain Cronin ordered Flight Engineer Thomas to tell the flight attendants to prepare for an emergency landing, but he was unable to contact them through the intercom. He asked the captain for permission to go down to find out what was happening, and he agreed. Thomas saw severe damage immediately upon leaving the cockpit; the aircraft skin was peeled off in some areas on the upper deck, revealing the frames and stringers. As he went down to the lower deck, the magnitude of the damage became apparent as he saw the large hole in the side of the cabin. He returned to the cockpit and reported that a large section of the fuselage was open aft of the Number 1 exit door. He concluded that it was probably a bomb, and that considering the damage, exceeding the plane's stall speed by more than a small margin would be unwise.

As the airliner neared the airport, the landing gear was extended. The flaps could only be partially deployed as a result of damage sustained following the decompression. Captain Cronin was able to bring the aircraft to a halt without overrunning the runway. About 14 minutes had elapsed since the emergency was declared. All the remaining passengers and flight attendants exited the aircraft in less than 45 seconds. Every flight attendant suffered some injury during the evacuation, ranging from scratches to a dislocated shoulder.

Despite extensive air and sea searches, no remains of the nine victims lost in flight were found at sea. Multiple small body fragments and pieces of clothing were found in the Number 3 engine, indicating that at least one victim ejected from the fuselage was ingested by the engine, but whether the fragments were from one or more victims was not known.

Investigation

NTSB initial investigation
The National Transportation Safety Board (NTSB) immediately commenced an investigation into the accident. An extensive air and surface search of the ocean had initially failed to locate the aircraft's cargo door. Though they were not able to inspect the cargo door, the NTSB proceeded with its investigation, and issued its final report on April 16, 1990.

The NTSB looked to circumstantial evidence, including prior incidents that involved cargo doors. After the safe landing, the aircraft's cargo door was found to be ajar by about  along its ventral edge. When the aircraft was examined in a maintenance hangar, all of the locking arms were found to be either damaged or entirely sheared off. Boeing initially attributed this to mishandling by ground crew. To test this concern, Boeing instructed 747 operators to shut and lock the cargo door with the external handle, and then activate the door-open switch with the handle still in the locked position. Since the S-2 switch was designed to deactivate the door motors if the handle was locked, nothing should have happened. Some of the airlines reported the door motors did indeed begin running, attempting to force the door open against the locking sectors and causing damage to the mechanism.

Based on the evidence available, and the attribution of prior cargo-door malfunctions to damage and ground crew mishandling, the NTSB operated from an assumption that a properly latched and locked 747 cargo door could not open in flight:

The NTSB learned that in N4713U's case, the aircraft had experienced intermittent malfunctions of its forward cargo door in the months prior to the accident. Based on this information, the NTSB concluded in its April 1990 report that these malfunctions had damaged the door locking mechanism in a way that caused the door to show a latched and locked indication, without being fully latched and locked. Thus, the NTSB attributed the accident to human error by the ground crew. Based on this hypothesis of in-service damage, the NTSB also faulted the airline for improper maintenance and inspection due to its failure to identify the damaged locking mechanism. Focusing on damage to the door and maintenance procedures, the NTSB concluded that the accident was preventable human error, and not a problem inherent in the design or function of the aircraft's cargo door.

Personal investigation and later developments
Lee Campbell, a New Zealander returning home, was one of the fatalities on Flight 811. After his death, his parents Kevin and Susan Campbell investigated the case using documents obtained from the NTSB. The Campbells' investigation led them to conclude that the cause of the accident was not human error, but rather the combination of an electrical problem and an inadequate design of the aircraft's cargo door-latching mechanism. They later presented their theory to the safety board.

The Boeing 747 was designed with an outward-hinging door, unlike a plug door which opens inward and jams against its frame as the pressure drops outside, making accidental opening at high altitude impossible. The outward-swinging door increases the cargo capacity, but requires a strong locking mechanism to keep it closed. Deficiencies in the design of wide-body aircraft cargo doors were known since the early 1970s from flaws in the DC-10 cargo door. These problems were not fully addressed by the aircraft industry or the FAA, despite the warnings and deaths from the DC-10 accidents and attempts by Boeing to solve the problems in the 1970s.

The 747's cargo door used a series of electrically operated latch cams into which the door-edge latch pins closed. The cams then rotated into a closed position, holding the door closed. A series of L-shaped arms (called locking sectors) were actuated by the final manual moving of a lever to close the door; these were designed to reinforce the unpowered latch cams and prevent them from rotating into an unlocked position. The locking sectors were made out of aluminum, and they were too thin to be able to keep the latch cams from moving into the unlocked position against the power of the door motors. Electrical switches cut electrical power to the cargo door when the outer handle was closed; however, if one of those were faulty, the motors could still draw power and rotate the latch cam to the open position. The same event could happen if frayed wires were able to power the cam motor, even if the circuit power was cut by the safety switch.

As early as 1975, Boeing realized that the aluminum locking sectors were too thin to be effective, and recommended the airlines to add doublers to the locking sectors. After the 1987 Pan Am incident, Boeing issued a service bulletin notifying operators to replace the aluminum locking sectors with steel locking sectors, and to carry out various inspections. In the United States, the FAA mandated this service by means of an airworthiness directive  in July 1988 and gave U.S. airlines 18 to 24 months to comply with it. After the Flight 811 accident, the FAA shortened the time to 30 days.

NTSB investigation reopened 

The cargo door had fractured lengthwise across the center. Recovery crews reported that no other debris or evidence of human remains had been discovered. The NTSB inspected the cargo door and determined that the condition of the locking mechanism did not support its original conclusions.

Additionally, in 1991, an incident occurred at New York's John F. Kennedy International Airport involving the malfunction of a United Airlines Boeing 747 cargo door. At the time, United Airlines' maintenance staff was investigating the cause of a circuit-breaker trip. In the process of diagnosing the cause, an inadvertent operation of the electric door latch mechanism caused the cargo door to open spontaneously despite being closed. An inspection of the door's electrical wiring discovered insulation breaches, and isolating certain electrical wires allowed the door to operate normally again. The lock sectors, latch cams, and latch pins on the door were inspected, and did not show any signs of damage of the type predicted by the NTSB's original hypothesis.

Final conclusions
Based on developments after it issued its original report in April 1990, the NTSB issued a superseding accident report on March 18, 1992. In this report, the NTSB determined that the probable cause of the accident was the sudden opening of the cargo door, which was attributed to improper wiring and deficiencies in the door's design. It appeared in this case that a short circuit caused an unordered rotation of the latch cams, which forced the weak locking sectors to distort and allow the rotation, thus enabling the pressure differential and aerodynamic forces to blow the door off the fuselage; ripping away the hinge fixing structure, the cabin floor, and the side fuselage skin; and causing the explosive decompression.

Outcomes

The NTSB issued a recommendation for all 747-100s in service at the time to replace their cargo door latching mechanisms with new, redesigned locks. A subrecommendation suggested replacing all outward-opening doors with inward-opening doors, which cannot open in flight due to the pressure differential. No similar accidents leading to loss of life have officially occurred on this aircraft type.

In 1989, the flight crew received the Secretary's Award for Heroism for their actions. The aircraft was repaired, re-registered as N4724U in 1989, and returned to service with United Airlines in 1990. In 1997, the aircraft was registered with Air Dabia as C5-FBS, and after that airline's collapse, abandoned in 2001 during overhaul maintenance at Plattsburgh International Airport. In 2004, the aircraft was scrapped for spare parts.

Captain David Cronin died on October 4, 2010, aged 81. First Officer Gregory Slader died on September 26, 2016, aged 75.

In popular culture
The events of Flight 811 were featured in "Unlocking Disaster", the season-one (2003) and first episode of the long-running Canadian TV series Mayday (called Air Emergency and Air Disasters in the U.S. and Air Crash Investigation internationally), which included interviews with survivors and a dramatization of the accident. The flight was also included in a Mayday season-six (2007) Science of Disaster special titled "Ripped Apart". This will be covered again in upcoming season 24, episode 1 of MaydayIt is featured in season 1, episode 2, of the TV show Why Planes Crash, in an episode called "Breaking Point".

The incident is featured in the bestselling book The Checklist Manifesto'' by Atul Gawande.

See also

 American Airlines Flight 96 – rapid decompression caused by a cargo door malfunction
 Turkish Airlines Flight 981 – explosive decompression caused by a cargo door malfunction
 Aloha Airlines Flight 243 – explosive decompression caused by metal fatigue in the fuselage
 British Airways Flight 5390 – explosive decompression caused by an improperly installed windscreen
 1975 Tân Sơn Nhứt C-5 accident – loss of control caused by failure of locking mechanism for the aft pressure door

References

External links
 First NTSB Aircraft Accident Report AAR-90/01 (superseded by Report AAR-92/02)
 Second NTSB Aircraft Accident Report AAR-92/02
 
 Transcript of cockpit voice recorder
 
 Pre-accident photos of N4713U
 The resting place of N4713U is 

1989 in Hawaii
Accidents and incidents involving the Boeing 747
Airliner accidents and incidents caused by in-flight structural failure
Airliner accidents and incidents in Hawaii
Aviation accidents and incidents in the United States in 1989
Airliner accidents and incidents involving in-flight depressurization
Disasters in Hawaii
811
February 1989 events in the United States
Daniel K. Inouye International Airport
Aviation accidents and incidents in 1989